Le Mourillon is a neighbourhood to the east of the French city of Toulon, near the entrance to the Rade or roadstead.  It was once a fishing village, and then became the home of many of the officers of the French fleet and to part of the naval dockyard. Mourillon has a small fishing port, next to a 16th-century fort, Fort Saint Louis, which was reconstructed by Vauban. In the 1970s the city of Toulon built a series of sheltered sandy beaches in Mourillon, which today are very popular with the Toulonais and with naval families. The Museum of Asian Art is located in a house on the waterfront near Fort St. Louis.

History

Points of interest
 Jardin d'acclimatation du Mourillon

Sport
Union sportive du Mourillon club de rugby à XV.
Cadets 2006/2007 Demi-Finalistes Teulière B
Cadets 2007/2008 Eliminated in the 16éme of Final Teulière B

References

External links 
Site of the quarter
History, old post cards of the district of Le Mourillon

Toulon
Geography of Var (department)